Paul Vincent Guilfoyle (born April 28, 1949) is an American television and film actor. He was a regular cast member of the CBS crime drama CSI: Crime Scene Investigation, on which he played Captain Jim Brass from 2000 to 2014. He returned for the series finale, "Immortality", in 2015. He also returned for two episodes in the sequel CSI: Vegas.

Early life
Guilfoyle was born in Boston, Massachusetts. He attended Boston College High School and spoke at the 2005 commencement of the school's seniors. He would later appear in Spotlight, which features the school. Guilfoyle graduated from Lehigh University in 1972.

He is a member of The Actors Studio and established a substantial theatrical reputation on and off Broadway, including 12 years with the Theatre Company of Boston, appearances on Broadway include in David Rabe's The Basic Training of Pavlo Hummel, Those The River Keeps, Richard III with Al Pacino, David Mamet's Glengarry Glen Ross, Death Defying Acts, and Search and Destroy.

Career
Guilfoyle appeared in Three Men and a Baby, and in an early episode of Crime Story, where he played a criminal who takes a hostage, getting into a shootout with the Major Crimes Unit. He has since become one of the industry's leading character actors specializing in roles on both the good and bad side of law enforcement.

His television appearances most notably include guest roles on Miami Vice, Law & Order, Wiseguy, New York Undercover, Ally McBeal and Justice League Unlimited as Travis Morgan, the Warlord. His film credits are numerous, spanning nearly three decades. His appearances in notable films include Howard the Duck, Wall Street, Celtic Pride, Beverly Hills Cop II, Quiz Show, Final Analysis, Hoffa, Mrs. Doubtfire, Air Force One, Striptease, Amistad, The Negotiator, Extreme Measures, Session 9, Primary Colors, and L.A. Confidential.

Guilfoyle also appears in Alter Bridge's video for their single "Broken Wings", and the HBO original movie Live from Baghdad.

Guilfoyle is best known for his role as L.V.P.D. Captain James "Jim" Brass in the CBS police drama CSI: Crime Scene Investigation, which he performed since the show's inception in 2000.

In 2014, it was announced that Guilfoyle would be leaving CSI: Crime Scene Investigation after 14 years, but returned in 2015 for the two-hour series finale "Immortality".

In 2020, he guest-starred on Star Trek: Discovery in the two-part story "Terra Firma", as Carl, the humanoid avatar of the Guardian of Forever.

Personal life
In 1989, Guilfoyle married choreographer and aerial artist Lisa Giobbi. They have one child and live in New York City.

Filmography

Film

Television

Video games

Awards and nominations

References

External links

1949 births
20th-century American male actors
21st-century American male actors
American male film actors
American male television actors
Boston College High School alumni
Lehigh University alumni
Living people
Male actors from Massachusetts
People from Canton, Massachusetts
Yale University alumni